China National Highway 328 (G328) runs from Nanjing to Hai'an in Jiangsu.

Route and distance

See also
China National Highways

Transport in Jiangsu
Transport in Nanjing
328